Polwathumodara railway station is a railway station on the coastal railway line of Sri Lanka. It is situated between Mirissa and Weligama railway stations.

Timetable
Trains to Colombo are available at 6.25 a.m. and 2.25 p.m. daily. Trains to Galle are available at 7.25 a.m., 10.35 a.m., 3.33 a.m. and 5.15 p.m. Trains to Matara are available at 6.26 a.m., 7.26 a.m., 10.36 a.m., 2.26 p.m., 3.34 p.m. and 5.15 p.m..

References

Railway stations on the Coastal Line
Railway stations in Matara District